Tillandsia capillaris is a species in the genus Tillandsia. This species is native to southern and western South America (Argentina, Chile, Uruguay, Paraguay, Bolivia, Peru, and Ecuador).

Three taxa are recognized at the "form" level:

Tillandsia capillaris f. capillaris - most of species range
Tillandsia capillaris f. cordobensis (Hieron.) L.B.Sm. - Bolivia, Peru, Argentina, Chile 
Tillandsia capillaris f. virescens (Ruiz & Pav.) L.B.Sm. - Bolivia, Peru, Argentina, Chile

References

capillaris
Flora of South America
Plants described in 1802